Marrakesh-Safi or Marrakech-Asfi (() is one of the ten Regions of Morocco. Its population in 2014 was 4,520,569. The capital is Marrakech.

History
Marrakech-Asfi was formed in September 2015 by merging the old region of Marrakech-Tensift-El Haouz with the provinces of Asfi and Youssoufia in Doukkala-Abda region.

Administrative divisions

The region is made up into the following provinces and prefectures:
 Prefecture of Marrakech
 Al Haouz Province
 Chichaoua Province
 El Kelâa des Sraghna Province
 Essaouira Province
 Rehamna Province
 Safi Province
 Youssoufia Province

References